Deep in the Hole is the fourth studio album of the American rock band Masters of Reality, released in 2001.

This album contained many guest appearances including Dave Catching, Josh Homme, Mark Lanegan, Troy Van Leeuwen, Nick Lucero, Brendon McNichol, Nick Oliveri, and Roxy Saint.

Track listing 
All songs written by Chris Goss, except where noted.

"Third Man on the Moon" (Goss, Leamy) - 5:12
"A Wish for a Fish" (Goss, Leamy) - 3:56
"Counting Horses" - 5:34
"Major Lance" - 1:02
"Scatagoria" - 4:09
"High Noon Amsterdam" (Goss, Leamy) - 3:45
"Corpus Scorpios Electrified"(Goss, Leamy) - 3:53
"Deep in the Hole"(Goss, Leamy) - 4:32
"Roof of the Shed" (Goss, Homme) - 4:30
"Shotgun Son" - 3:10

References

 

Masters of Reality albums
2001 albums
Albums produced by Chris Goss